Joey Jones (born 1955) is a Welsh former footballer.

Joey Jones may also refer to:
 Joey Jones (American football) (born 1962), college football coach at the University of South Alabama
 Joey Jones (footballer, born 1994)
 Joey Jones (journalist), British journalist

See also
Joe Jones (disambiguation)
Joseph Jones (disambiguation)